Masood Ashraf Raja (Urdu: مسعود اشرف راجہ) is a Pakistani-born American writer. Previously, he was an associate professor of postcolonial literature and theory at the University of North Texas. He is also the editor of Pakistaniaat: A Journal of Pakistan Studies, an open access journal that he founded in 2009.

Early life and education
Raja moved to the United States in 1996, after ten years of service in the Pakistan Army as an Infantry officer.

Raja graduated with a Masters in literature from Belmont University in 2002, where he was awarded the Graduate Writing Award and at Florida State he was awarded the Davis Award for Best Graduate Student and Davis Award for best dissertation in 2005 and 2006, respectively.

Raja earned his PhD in postcolonial studies from Florida State University in 2006, where he studied with Robin Truth Goodman.

Career
Besides teaching and writing about issues of postcoloniality, globalisation, and political Islam, Raja also actively participates in the public debates through his public writing on his two blogs as well as other popular and scholarly websites.

Raja's monograph, Constructing Pakistan, (Oxford University Press, 2010), is an interesting explanation of the rise of Muslim national political identity during the British Raj and offers an innovative explanation of the genesis of the idea of Pakistan. Raja has published extensively in his area of study and on general academic topics in various academic journals and anthologies. Raja is a member of the Advisory Committee (2009–12) of PMLA, the premier journal of literature and languages and was elected to a five-year term on the Executive Committee of the South Asian Studies Group, Modern Language Association. Besides his academic and popular writings, Raja has  actively presented his views at academic conferences as well as through public talks.

Raja has contributed his views on various issues related to the Islamic world and Pakistan to newspapers such as the Fort Worth Star-Telegram on a story on Osama bin Laden and to Aljazeera English on a story about the Blasphemy law in Pakistan.

Having won a million dollar grant from the US State Department, Raja is the Director of a partnership program between the University of North Texas and the National University of Modern Languages in Islamabad.

Raja continues to contribute his thoughts on issues of social justice, political Islam, and issues of human rights.

Publications
Raja has published extensively on issues related to postcolonial studies, political Islam, and about Pakistan and the region. Besides his academic work, Raja also writes poetry and fiction. Raja's most recent book ISIS: Ideology, Symbolics, and Counter Narratives provides a thorough discussion of the ideological roots of ISIS.

 ISIS: Ideology, Symbolics, and Counter Narratives . Routledge, 2019.
 The Religious Right and the Talibanization of America. Palgrave-Macmillan, 2016.
Critical Pedagogy and Global Literature: Worldly Teaching. (Co-edited with hillary Stringer and Zach VandeZande) Palgrave-Macmillan, 2013.
The Postnational Fantasy: Nationalism, Cosmopolitics and Science Fiction. (Co-edited with Jason W. Ellis and Swaralipi Nandi). McFarland Press, 2011.
Constructing Pakistan: Foundational Texts and the Rise of Muslim National Identity 1857-1947. Oxford University Press, 2010.

References

External links
 Pakistaniaat: A journal of Pakistan Studies, Editor
 Postcolonial Space

Living people
American bloggers
American educational theorists
21st-century American historians
American literary critics
American political writers
American academics of Pakistani descent
Pakistani bloggers
Pakistani emigrants to the United States
Pakistani educational theorists
21st-century Pakistani historians
Pakistani literary critics
Pakistani political writers
Postcolonial theorists
Islam and politics
1965 births
People from Rawalpindi District
Florida State University alumni
University of North Texas faculty
Pakistani expatriates in the United States